Perkinsiodendron is a genus of flowering plants belonging to the family Styracaceae.

Its native range is Southern China.

Species:
 Perkinsiodendron macgregorii (Chun) P.W.Fritsch

References

Styracaceae
Ericales genera